George Spencer Vecsey (born July 4, 1939) is an American non-fiction author and sports columnist for The New York Times. Vecsey is best known for his work in sports, but has co-written several autobiographies with non-sports figures. He is also the older brother of fellow sports journalist, columnist, and former NBATV and NBA on NBC color commentator Peter Vecsey.

Life and career
Vecsey was born on July 4, 1939, in the Jamaica neighborhood of Queens in New York City to George and May Vecsey.

Vecsey has written about such events as the FIFA World Cup and the Olympics and on a wide variety of sports including tennis, football, basketball, hockey, soccer, and boxing, but considers baseball, the sport he's covered since 1960, his favorite, and has written more books about it than any other sport.

He is the author of more than a dozen books, including Baseball: A History of America’s Favorite Game and Loretta Lynn: Coal Miner’s Daughter (with American country singer Loretta Lynn), which was made into an Academy Award–winning film. Vecsey has also served as a national and religion reporter for The New York Times, interviewing the Dalai Lama, former British prime minister Tony Blair, American Christian evangelist Billy Graham, and a host of other noteworthy figures.

In addition to assisting Loretta Lynn, Vecsey has also helped several other celebrities and high-profile figures write their autobiographies, including American country singer Barbara Mandrell and Chinese human rights activist Harry Wu. His work in this field has ranged from co-writing credits, to being listed as a contributor (as in Lynn's Coal Miner's Daughter), to being listed as a consultant.

Works

Vecsey's baseball books cover several different periods of the game. In The Rivals, he covers the entire history of the Yankees–Red Sox rivalry from the first half of the century up until recent years. He has also written books exclusively about modern baseball history such as McGwire and Sosa, about the home run record chase by Mark McGwire and Sammy Sosa that took place in 1998, and Subway 2000, about the New York Mets and New York Yankees Subway Series that took place in 2000.

Vescey co-wrote Cy Young Award winner Bob Welch's 1991 autobiography, Five O'Clock Comes Early, chronicling Welch's rise to Major League Baseball stardom and his struggle against alcohol addiction.

Vecsey also authored a chapter of the literary hoax Naked Came the Stranger.

His Baseball: A History of America's Favorite Game (Modern Library, 2006) is a concise history of the game of professional baseball.

In 2011, ESPN published Stan Musial: An American Life, Vecsey's biography of twenty-time All-Star and St. Louis Cardinals icon Stan Musial. Reviewing the book, George Will wrote, "At long last, George Vecsey has taken Musial's measure in this delightful biography of a man and a baseball era." Tim Kurkjian, Senior Writer for ESPN Magazine and analyst for ESPN's Baseball Tonight and SportsCenter, said that the book was "a fascinating and profound look at the most underrated great player of all time, and one of the true gentlemen of the game."

He was the 2013 recipient of the National Soccer Hall of Fame's Colin Jose Media Award. His book Eight World Cups: My Journey through the Beauty and Dark Side of Soccer was published in May, 2014.

Personal life

Vecsey is the older brother of New York Post sports columnist Peter Vecsey and the father of Laura Vecsey, the Harrisburg Patriot-News political columnist; David Vecsey, a copy editor at The New York Times Magazine; and Corinna Vecsey Wilson, president of the consulting firm Wilson500, Inc.

Vecsey received a Bachelor of Arts degree from Hofstra University in 1960. He was awarded an honorary doctorate from Hofstra in 1990.

Unlike many other well-known sports columnists, Vecsey does not often appear on television.

Vecsey lives in Port Washington, New York, with his wife, Marianne, an artist.

References

External links
Personal website
Column archive at The New York Times

Stan Musial: An American Life

1939 births
20th-century American journalists
20th-century American male writers
21st-century American journalists
21st-century American male writers
American male journalists
Baseball writers
Christians from New York (state)
Hofstra University alumni
Living people
The New York Times columnists
The New York Times sportswriters
People from Jamaica, Queens
People from Port Washington, New York
Religion journalists
Sportswriters from New York (state)
Writers from Queens, New York
American people of Hungarian descent